Soderquist or Söderquist is a surname. Notable people with the surname include: 

Claes Söderquist (born 1939), Swedish artist and filmmaker
Don Soderquist (1934-2016), American businessman
Larry Soderquist (1944-2005), American legal scholar
Ryan Soderquist, American ice hockey coach